The Assassination & Mrs. Paine is a 2022 documentary film directed by Max Good. The film explores the story of Ruth Paine and her former husband Michael Paine and their connections to the assassination of John F. Kennedy. As a key witness and friend of Marina Oswald and Lee Harvey Oswald, conspiracy theorists have long suspected Ruth Paine of a sinister role in a wider plot.

Festival screenings
Ashland Independent Film Festival (2022)
SF Docfest (2022)
Atlanta Docufest (2022)
San Antonio Film Festival (2022)
New Haven Documentary Film Festival (2022)
Revelation Perth International Film Festival (2022)

References

External links
 
 

2022 films
2022 documentary films
American documentary films
2010s English-language films
2010s American films